Big Hole may refer to:

The Big Hole, a former open-pit mine in Kimberley, South Africa
Big Hole National Battlefield, a memorial in Montana, United States
Big Hole (Oregon), a large explosion crater in Lake County, Oregon
Battle of the Big Hole, a battle during the Nez Perce War of 1877
Big Hole Pass, a high mountain pass in Montana
Big Hole National Forest, a former National Forest in Montana and Idaho